Shwetha Menon is an Indian actress, model and television anchor. She has won Femina Miss India Asia Pacific 1994. She has predominantly acted in Malayalam and Hindi language films, besides appearing in a number of Telugu and Tamil Language Films. She won two Kerala State Film Awards for Best Actress. She participated in Bigg Boss Malayalam Season 1.

Starting her career as an actress in Malayalam feature films in the early 1990s, she ventured into modeling and became noted, after participating and winning at several beauty pageants, which led to her debut in Bollywood. It was the film Ishq (1997) where she received notable attention as the dancer for the song, "Humko Tumse Pyaar Hai", featuring Aamir Khan and Ajay Devgn and also in Bandhan (1998). Following appearances in over 30 Hindi films, in which she generally conveyed a glamorous image, her acting career took a turn by the mid-2000s, with her returning to Malayalam cinema and accepting substantial roles. She received critical praise and several accolades including the Kerala State Film Award for Best Actress for her performances in Paleri Manikyam: Oru Pathirakolapathakathinte Katha (2009) and Salt N' Pepper (2011). In 2018, she contestant in the Malayalam reality TV series Bigg Boss and was eliminated after 36 episodes aired on Asianet, hosted by the veteran actor Mohanlal.She simultaneously appeared in commercial films, television reality shows and parallel films.

Early life
Menon hails from Valanchery in Malappuram district in Kerala, but was born at Chandigarh to Malayali parents T. V. Naranankutty and Sarada Menon. Her father served in the Indian Air Force while her mother remained a housewife. She studied in Kendriya Vidyalaya No. 1, East Hill, Kozhikode.

Career

Films
She started her career as an actress in the Malayalam film Anaswaram (1991), directed by Jomon, playing the female lead opposite Mammootty, after which she focused on modeling. She competed in the Miss India contest in 1994 and finished third runner-up behind Sushmita Sen, Aishwarya Rai and Fransesca Hart. She became the first Gladrags female super model in 1994 (Kelly Dorjee was the male super model) and then, Miss Asia Pacific semi-finalist in 1994 in Manila Cebu Island, Philippines. She subsequently made her debut in Bollywood and appeared in over 30 films; some of her Bollywood films include Asoka (2001), Maqbool (2003) and Corporate (2006).

Menon returned to Malayalam in 2006 with Thantra and then went on to do famous Malayalam films such as Keerthi Chakra (2006) and the award-winning Paradesi. Her performance as Sarojini, a middle-class woman who fights against extreme odds, in Madhya Venal earned her a special mention by jury chairman Bahman Ghobadi, a famous Iranian director at the International Film Festival of Kerala. In 2010, she won the Kerala State Government's Best Actress for her portrayal of Cheeru, a village woman in the film Paleri Manikyam: Oru Pathirakolapathakathinte Katha directed by Ranjith. She won the Mathrubhumi-Amrita TV Special Jury Award and the Asianet Film Award for Best Supporting Actress for the same film. In 2011, Shweta Menon starred in the remake of Rathinirvedam an Erotic Movie, playing the titular character, originally played by Jayabharathi. In the same year, she got the Kerala State Award for Salt N' Pepper. For her next movie, Naval Enna Jewel, Shweta Menon has undergone a remarkable makeover as an elderly man.

In 2010, Menon approached a local court and the Women's Commission in Kerala after the distributor of her movie tied up with Musli Power, a sex stimulant drug, to jointly promote the movie. "Met with Women's Commission regarding the Kayam ad and they offered me full backing. Thank you all and I hope justice will be done," she tweeted.

Television
Besides working in films, she has anchored several TV, stage and film awards shows. Menon rose to popularity after presenting the musical programme, Star Wars on Kairali TV in 2008. She won the Asian Television Award for Best Anchor for the same program. In Hindi, she hosted the group band based show, Razzmatazz on Zee TV with actor Arshad Warsi. The next television show she did was Dancing Queen in 2008 on Colors. In 2010, she anchored the Malayalam reality show, Honeymoon Travels on Surya TV. The show became an instant hit for Shwetha's accented Malayalam and her attempts to read from the original script without a formal learning in the language. Recently, she appeared as a contestant with her father in the game show, Deal or No Deal on Surya TV. She was the anchor of the family-based reality show Veruthe Alla Bharya on Mazhavil Manorama. She has participated in the popular game show Ningalkkum Aakaam Kodeeshwaran on Asianet. She was running popular comedy reality show Minto Goal Comedy Stars on Asianet in 2015. She has acted in many advertisements. She was a contestant in the season 1 of the reality TV show Bigg Boss aired on Asianet, from which she was eliminated after 36 episodes. In 2019 she made her TV comeback as the host for a family talent hunt show on Mazhavil Manorama titled Kusurthi Kudumbam.

Personal life
She was married to Bollywood model, Bobby Bhonsle, but it ended up in divorce. On 18 June 2011, she married Sreevalsan Menon, a native of Thrissur, who works in Mumbai. The ceremony took place at the Neythalappurath Sastha Ayappa temple, Valanchery, Kerala. She had her first child, a daughter, Sabaina Menon on 27 September 2012, at 5.27 pm at Nanavati Hospital in Mumbai. The delivery was recorded on camera as part of the film Kalimannu.

Controversies
Shwetha Menon was charged with insulting the Indian flag at a fashion show on 5 January 2004. The show was organized by NIFD at a resort, where Menon walked the ramp allegedly with the tricolour wrapped around her body.

In 2011, she had filed a case against Kunnath Pharmaceuticals' managing director K. C. Abraham for misusing stills from her film Kayam (2011) for promoting their Ayurvedic aphrodisiac Musli Power Extra. The Ernakulam Central Police arrested Abraham.

Shwetha allowed her delivery to be recorded for Blessy's film Kalimannu (2013). The act was condemned for commercializing the most private affair of a woman by the Kerala Film Exhibitors.

On 4 November 2013, she filed a case against N. Peethambara Kurup of the Indian National Congress in a groping incident. Shweta later dropped her complaint against Kurup, saying the 71-year-old leader tendered a "personal apology" to her hours after she lodged the FIR against him.

Accolades

Kerala State Film Awards
 2009 – Best Actress – Paleri Manikyam: Oru Pathirakolapathakathinte Katha
 2011 – Best Actress – Salt N' Pepper

Filmfare Awards South
 2009 – Best Actress – Malayalam – Paleri Manikyam: Oru Pathirakolapathakathinte Katha

South Indian International Movie Awards
 2012 – SIIMA Award for Actress – Special Appreciation – Rathinirvedam
 2013 – SIIMA Award for Best Supporting Actress – Ozhimuri

Other Awards
 2009 – Asian Television Award for Best TV Anchor
 2009 – Special Mention at International Film Festival of Kerala by Jury Chairman, Bahman Ghobadi about performance in Madhyavenal
 2010 – Amrita TV – Mathrubhumi Special Jury Award – Paleri Manikyam: Oru Pathirakolapathakathinte Katha
 2010 – Asianet Film Award for Best Supporting Actress – Paleri Manikyam: Oru Pathirakolapathakathinte Katha
 2013 – Asianet Film Awards for Best Character Actress – Ozhimuri
 2013 – Asiavision Awards – Outstanding Performance – Kalimannu
2018 : Milan Film Festival 2018 - Best Supporting Actress  -Naval Enna Jewel

Filmography

Dubbing artist 
In 2017, she lent her voice for the role of a police officer played by Raashi Khanna in Malayalam film Villain (2017)

Television

References

External links
 Official website
 
 Shweta Menon Photo Gallery

Living people
People from Malappuram district
Actresses from Kerala
Indian film actresses
Femina Miss India winners
Kerala State Film Award winners
Actresses in Hindi cinema
Actresses in Tamil cinema
Actresses in Malayalam cinema
Filmfare Awards South winners
Kendriya Vidyalaya alumni
20th-century Indian actresses
21st-century Indian actresses
Actresses in Telugu cinema
Actresses from Chandigarh
Indian television actresses
Actresses in Malayalam television
Actresses in Hindi television
Female models from Kerala
Female models from Chandigarh
Year of birth missing (living people)
Bigg Boss Malayalam contestants
Actresses in Kannada cinema